The Sharabha Upanishad (IAST: Sharabha Upaniṣad) is a minor Upanishads of the Atharva Veda. In a Telugu language anthology of 108 Upanishads of the Muktika in the modern era, narrated by Rama to Hanuman, it is listed at serial number 50.  It is one of the 14 Shaiva Upanishads.

The Upanishad eulogizes Lord Shiva as the Lord of the world who incarnates as Sharabha – a human-lion-bird version, to confront the human-lion Narasimha avatar of Vishnu, when Narasimha becomes destructive.

The text is also called as the "Pippaladadharmasastra," as an exposition of the knowledge by Lord Brahma to sage Pippalada. Its title is also spelled as Sarabha Upanishad or Sharabhopanishad.

Contents
The Upanishad, after an initial prayer offering to Indra, Garuda, and Brihaspati seeking prosperity and peace to all, extols Lord Shiva or Mahesvara, in the first two verses as original God, creator of Brahma, Vishnu and other divinities, as governs the world, as the chief architect of the Vedas who conveyed it to Brahma, who dismantled the universe at the great flood, and was the Lord of Lords.

In the third verse of the Upanishad the narration is of Shiva incarnating as Sarabha, in the form of a fierce anthropomorphic combination of eagle, lion, and man. Sarabha being very powerful subdues God Narasimha, an incarnation of Vishnu, because he was causing destruction in the world by exerting more and more power on him and as result of that God Narasimha left his violent form , the skin of lion got peeled off and God Narasimha returned to His original four armed form i.e God Vishnu or God Narayana . According to the Puranas, Sarabha was one of Shiva's sixty four avatars (forms), to assist the heavenly devas and the human beings.

In the fourth verse, the Upanishad states that after killing Narasimha with his claws, Sarabha wore its hide as his attire and came to be called Veera Bhadra. In the fifth verse Sarabha cuts the fifth head of Brahma, and in the sixth verse He fells Kala (time), the God of death, with his feet. He consumes Halahala, the poison that was created along with Amrita (nectar of immortality), during cosmic creation through the churning of the ocean.

In the seventh verse, Shiva, pleased with the veneration of Vishnu, gifts him with the Chakra (holy wheel) – the iconography commonly found in one of the hands of Vishnu murtis. In the last three verses, the Upanishad  assures the efficacy of Shiva to burn all sins away if they are caused and perpetuated by others.

Maheshwara's incarnation as Sarabha signifies Paramatman, combining all facets of body, mind and jeeva. Narration of the Upanishad, states the text, gives Moksha or salvation.

References

Bibliography

Upanishads